, professionally known as , is a Japanese actor and voice actor. He is represented by LDH.

Biography
Katsuya was born as the youngest brother. He learned football when he was in elementary school. When he moved to Tokyo at the age of 22 Katsuya had a part-time job as a construction assistant.

He said that his great-grandfather came from the Netherlands who came to Japan to sell jewelry during the Meiji period.

Filmography

TV series

Anime television

Direct-to-video

Films

Video games

Musicals

Theatre

Internet

Dubbing

References

External links
 

Japanese male film actors
Japanese male musical theatre actors
Japanese male television actors
Japanese male voice actors
1975 births
Living people
Actors from Hyōgo Prefecture
Japanese people of Dutch descent
LDH (company) artists
21st-century Japanese male actors